Victor Hanson may refer to:

 Vic Hanson (1903–1982), American college athlete and coach
 Victor Davis Hanson (born 1953), American classicist, military historian and political commentator
 Victor Henry Hanson (1876–1945), American publisher

See also
 Victor M. Hansen, American lawyer and military officer
 Victor Hansen (1889-1974), Danish jurist, entomologist, and tennis player